Papravand mausoleum – is a mausoleum in Papravənd village in Agdam District of Azerbaijan. It was constructed in the 14th century. The mausoleum is considered as a unique monument of the architecture of medieval ages. The mausoleum was cleaned, measured and learnt in July, 1972.

Since the summer of 1993, the part of Aghdam District where the mausoleum is located, has been controlled by the unrecognized Republic of Artsakh and according to the United Nations Security Council Resolution 853 it is occupied by the Armenian armed forces.

Architecture
The mausoleum is quadrangular in its external shape, but the inner hall is cross-shaped.

The plan of the mausoleum is typical for the 16th century and is related to the construction of the cupola. Its central part is covered with a cupola, but its branches are covered with ogives. The transition of the central square to the cupola is made with the help of pendentives.

Entrance to the mausoleum is from the open veranda of the main facade.

At present, the mausoleum is partly destroyed. There aren’t any ligatures on the mausoleum. Taking into account the architectural structure of the building - arched construction with a cupola, and also the decorative work on the facades’ walls, the monument dates from the 16th century.

References

Literature
 Мамед-заде К. М. Паправендский мавзолей. — ДАН Азерб. ССР, 1974. — № 12. — С. 86— 89.

Buildings and structures completed in the 14th century
Mausoleums in Azerbaijan
Tourist attractions in Azerbaijan
Islamic architecture
Buildings and structures in Aghdam District